The men's decathlon event at the 2007 European Athletics U23 Championships was held in Debrecen, Hungary, at Gyulai István Atlétikai Stadion on 12 and 13 July.

Medalists

Results

Final
12-13 July

Participation
According to an unofficial count, 12 athletes from 8 countries participated in the event.

 (1)
 (1)
 (2)
 (2)
 (1)
 (2)
 (2)
 (1)

References

Decathlon
Combined events at the European Athletics U23 Championships